Daceton is a Neotropical genus of ants in the subfamily Myrmicinae. The genus contains only two species: D. armigerum, the most studied species, distributed throughout northern South America, and D. boltoni, known from Brazil and Peru.

Species
Daceton armigerum (Latreille, 1802)
Daceton boltoni Azorsa & Sosa-Calvo, 2008

References

External links

Myrmicinae
Ant genera
Hymenoptera of South America